Bielawki may refer to the following places:
Bielawki, Kuyavian-Pomeranian Voivodeship (north-central Poland)
Bielawki, Łódź Voivodeship (central Poland)
Bielawki, Kartuzy County in Pomeranian Voivodeship (north Poland)
Bielawki, Tczew County in Pomeranian Voivodeship (north Poland)